Çamalan is a village in Tarsus district of Mersin Province, Turkey. It is in the Taurus Mountains and to the west of Turkish state highway . The population of village was 219 as of 2012. The village was founded in the 16th century by Turkmens of the Alevi sect. They escaped from the harsh treatment of the Ottoman sultan Selim I to the forests of the mountainous area for concealment. Their main economic activity was forestry, and they were called tahtacı ("woodman"). Nowadays, however, the majority of the village population is retired people from the cities in the Çukurova plains (Cilicia of the antiquity).

References

Villages in Tarsus District